An aircraft pilot or aviator is a person who controls the flight of an aircraft by operating its directional flight controls. Some other aircrew members, such as navigators or flight engineers, are also considered aviators, because they are involved in operating the aircraft's navigation and engine systems. Other aircrew members, such as drone operators, flight attendants, mechanics and ground crew, are not classified as aviators.

In recognition of the pilots' qualifications and responsibilities, most militaries and many airlines worldwide award aviator badges to their pilots.

Definition

The term aviatrix (aviatrice in French), now archaic, was formerly used for a female pilot. The term aviator (aviateur in French), now archaic, was formerly used for a male pilot. People who operate aircraft obtain a pilot licence. Aviation regulations referred to pilots. These terms were used more in the early days of aviation, when airplanes were extremely rare, and connoted bravery and adventure. For example, a 1905 reference work described the Wright brothers' first airplane: "The weight, including the body of the aviator, is a little more than 700 pounds".

History

To ensure the safety of people in the air and on the ground, early aviation soon required that aircraft be under the operational control of a properly trained, certified pilot at all times, who is responsible for the safe and legal completion of the flight. The  Aéro-Club de France delivered the first certificate to Louis Blériot in 1908—followed by Glenn Curtiss, Léon Delagrange, and Robert Esnault-Pelterie. The British Royal Aero Club followed in 1910 and the Aero Club of America in 1911 (Glenn Curtiss receiving the first).

Civilian

Civilian pilots fly aircraft of all types privately for pleasure, charity, or in pursuance of a business, or commercially for non-scheduled (charter) and scheduled passenger and cargo air carriers (airlines), corporate aviation, agriculture (crop dusting, etc.), forest fire control, law enforcement, etc. When flying for an airline, pilots are usually referred to as airline pilots, with the pilot in command often referred to as the captain.

Airline
There were 290,000 airline pilots in the world in 2017 and aircraft simulator manufacturer CAE Inc. forecasts a need for 255,000 new ones for a population of 440,000 by 2027, 150,000 for growth and 105,000 to offset retirement and attrition : 90,000 in Asia-Pacific (average pilot age in 2016: 45.8 years), 85,000 in Americas (48 years), 50,000 in Europe (43.7 years) and 30,000 in Middle East & Africa (45.7 years).

Boeing expects 790,000 new pilots in 20 years from 2018, 635,000 for commercial aviation, 96,000 for business aviation and 59,000 for helicopters: % in Asia Pacific (261,000), % in North America (206,000), % in Europe (146,000), % in the Middle East (64,000), % in Latin America (57,000), % in Africa (29,000) and % in Russia/ Central Asia (27,000).
By November 2017, due a shortage of qualified pilots, some pilots were leaving corporate aviation to return to airlines. In one example a Global 6000 pilot, making $250,000 a year for 10 to 15 flight hours a month, returned to American Airlines with full seniority.
A Gulfstream G650 or Global 6000 pilot might earn between $245,000 and $265,000, and recruiting one may require up to $300,000.
At the other end of the spectrum, constrained by the available pilots, some small carriers hire new pilots who need 300 hours to jump to airlines in a year. They may also recruit non-career pilots who have other jobs or airline retirees who want to continue to fly.

Automation
The number of airline pilots could decrease as automation replaces copilots and eventually pilots as well. In January 2017 Rhett Ross, CEO of Continental Motors said "my concern is that in the next two decades—if not sooner—automated and autonomous flight will have developed sufficiently to put downward pressure on both wages and the number and kind of flying jobs available. So if a kid asks the question now and he or she is 18, 20 years from now will be 2037 and our would-be careerist will be 38—not even mid-career. Who among us thinks aviation and especially for-hire flying will look like it does now?" Christian Dries, owner of Diamond Aircraft Austria said "Behind the curtain, aircraft manufacturers are working on a single-pilot cockpit where the airplane can be controlled from the ground and only in case of malfunction does the pilot of the plane interfere. Basically the flight will be autonomous and I expect this to happen in the next five to six years for freighters."

In August 2017 financial company UBS predicted pilotless airliners are technically feasible and could appear around 2025, offering around $35bn of savings, mainly in pilot costs: $26bn for airlines, $3bn for business jets and $2.1bn for civil helicopters; $3bn/year from lower pilot training and aviation insurance costs due to safer flights; $1bn from flight optimisation (1% of global airlines' $133bn jet fuel bill in 2016); not counting revenue opportunity from increased capacity utilization.

Regulations have to adapt with air cargo likely at the forefront, but pilotless flights could be limited by consumer behaviour: 54% of 8,000 people surveyed are defiant while 17% are supportive, with acceptation progressively forecast.

AVweb reporter Geoff Rapoport stated, "pilotless aircraft are an appealing prospect for airlines bracing for the need to hire several hundred thousand new pilots in the next decade. Wages and training costs have been rapidly rising at regional U.S. airlines over the last several years as the major airlines have hired pilots from the regionals at unprecedented rates to cover increased air travel demand from economic expansion and a wave of retirements".

Going to pilotless airliners could be done in one bold step or in gradual improvements like by reducing the cockpit crew for long haul missions or allowing single pilot cargo aircraft. The industry has not decided how to proceed yet. Present automated systems are not autonomous and must be monitored; their replacement could require artificial intelligence with machine learning while present certified software is deterministic.
As the Airbus A350 would only need minor modifications, Air Caraibes and French Bee parent Groupe Dubreuil see two-pilot crews in long-haul operations, without a third pilot for rotation, happening around 2024–2025.

Single-pilot freighters could start with regional flights.
The Air Line Pilots Association believe removing pilots would threaten aviation safety and opposes the April 2018 FAA Reauthorization Act's Section 744 establishing a research and development program to assist single-pilot cargo aircraft by remote and computer piloting.

For French aerospace research center Onera and avionics manufacturer Thales, artificial intelligence (AI) like consumer Neural Networks learning from large datasets cannot explain their operation and cannot be certified for safe air transport.
Progress towards ‘explainable’ AIs can be expected in the next decade, as the Onera expects “leads” for a certifiable AI system, along EASA standards evolution.

Africa and Asia
In some countries, such as Pakistan, Thailand and several African nations, there is a strong relationship between the military and the principal national airlines, and many airline pilots come from the military; however, that is no longer the case in the United States and Western Europe. While the flight decks of U.S. and European airliners do have ex-military pilots, many pilots are civilians. Military training and flying, while rigorous, is fundamentally different in many ways from civilian piloting.

Canada
Operating an aircraft in Canada is regulated by the Aeronautics Act of 1985 and the Canadian Aviation Regulations provide rules for Pilot licensing in Canada.

Retirement age is provided by each airline with some set to age 60, but changes to the Canadian Human Rights Act have restricted retirement age set by the airlines.

United States
In the United States in 2020, there were 691,691 active pilot certificates. This was down from a high of over 800,000 active pilots in 1980. Of the active pilot certificate holders, there were 160,860 Private,  103,879 Commercial, 164,193 Airline Transport, and 222,629 Student.
  
In 1930, the Air Commerce Act established pilot licensing requirements for American civil aviation.

Commercial airline pilots in the United States have a mandatory retirement age of 65, having increased from age 60 in 2007.

Military

Military pilots fly with the armed forces, primarily the air forces, of a government or nation-state. Their tasks involve combat and non-combat operations, including direct hostile engagements and support operations. Military pilots undergo specialized training, often with weapons. Examples of military pilots include fighter pilots, bomber pilots, transport pilots, test pilots and astronauts.

Military pilots are trained with a different syllabus than civilian pilots, which is delivered by military instructors. This is due to the different aircraft, flight goals, flight situations and chains of responsibility. Many military pilots do transfer to civilian-pilot qualification after they leave the military, and typically their military experience provides the basis for a civilian pilot's license.

Unmanned aerial vehicles

Unmanned aerial vehicles (UAVs, also known as "drones") operate without a pilot on-board and are classed into two categories: autonomous aircraft that operate without active human control during flight and remotely piloted UAVs which are operated remotely by one or more persons. The person controlling a remotely piloted UAV may be referred to as its pilot or operator. Depending on the sophistication and use of the UAV, pilots/operators of UAVs may require certification or training, but are generally not subject to the licensing/certification requirements of pilots of manned aircraft.

Most jurisdictions have restrictions on the use of UAVs which have greatly limited their use in controlled airspace; UAVs have mostly been limited to military and hobbyist use. In the United States, use of UAVs is very limited in controlled airspace (generally, above 400 ft/122m and away from airports) and the FAA prohibits nearly all commercial use. Once regulations are made to allow expanded use of UAVs in controlled airspace, there is expected to be a large surge of UAVs in use and, consequently, high demand for pilots/operators of these aircraft.

Space

The general concept of an airplane pilot can be applied to human spaceflight, as well. The spacecraft pilot is the astronaut who directly controls the operation of a spacecraft. This term derives directly from the usage of the word "pilot" in aviation, where it is synonymous with "aviator".

Pilot certifications

Pilots are required to go through many hours of flight training and theoretical study, that differ depending on the country. The first step is acquiring the Private Pilot License (PPL), or Private Pilot Certificate.  In the United States of America, this includes a minimum of 35 to 40 hours of flight training, the majority of which with a Certified Flight Instructor. 

In the United States, an LSA (Light Sport Aircraft) license can be obtained in at least 20 hours of flight time.

The next step in a pilot's progression is either Instrument Rating (IR), or Multi-Engine Rating (MEP) endorsements.

If a professional career or professional-level skills are desired, a Commercial Pilot License (CPL) would also be required. To captain an airliner, one must obtain an Airline Transport Pilot License (ATPL). After 1 August 2013, even when being a First Officer (FO), an ATPL is required. Some countries/carriers require/use a multi-crew cooperation (MCC) certificate.

See also
Airline pilot uniforms
Air safety
IMSAFE (mnemonic for pilot's fitness to fly)
List of aerospace engineers
List of aviators
List of Russian aviators
Pilot fatigue
Pilot logbook

References

External links

U.S. Women Pilots Statistics 1960–2010 

 

 
Military aviation occupations
Occupations in aviation